Kraussella amabile is a species of grasshopper in the family Acrididae found in Africa.

In Mali, it is eaten by the Dogon people.

Gallery

References

External links 
 
 
 Names in Dogon languages, with images from Mali

Acrididae
Orthoptera of Africa
Edible insects